Rhytida citrina is a species of medium-sized, air-breathing predatory land snail, a terrestrial pulmonate gastropod mollusc in the eponymous family Rhytididae.

References

 Powell A W B, New Zealand Mollusca, William Collins Publishers Ltd, Auckland, New Zealand 1979 

Gastropods of New Zealand
Rhytida
Taxa named by Frederick Hutton (scientist)
Gastropods described in 1883
Endemic fauna of New Zealand
Endemic molluscs of New Zealand